The Tyro Stakes is an American Thoroughbred horse race run annually near in July at Monmouth Park Racetrack in Oceanport, New Jersey. A non-graded stakes race offering a current purse of $60,000, it is open to two-year-old horses weighted at 122 pounds with allowances. It was a run on a dirt track from inception until 2012 when it became a race on turf. It is currently contested at a distance of five furlongs.

In 1886, this race was won by Tremont, the United States Champion Two-Year-Old Male.  Tremont won every one of his 13 races during a period of 10 weeks but refused to train at the age of three. The great California filly, Los Angeles, won this race in 1887.

Most wins by a jockey:

 4 – Joe Bravo: (1991, 2003, 2008, 2020)

Most wins by a trainer:

 4 –Steve Asmussen: (2005, 2007, 2011, 2020)
 4 – Wesley Ward: (2012, 2017, 2019, 2021)

Most wins by an owner:

 3 – New Farm: (1993, 1998, 2010)

Winners since 1989

 2018: off turf

References
 The Tyro Stakes at Pedigree Query
 The 2008 Tyro Stakes at Bonnie Heath Farm

Ungraded stakes races in the United States
Turf races in the United States
Flat horse races for two-year-old fillies
Horse races in New Jersey
Monmouth Park Racetrack